The Neural network synchronization protocol, abbreviated as NNSP, is built on the application-level layer of the OSI upon TCP/IP. Aiming at secure communication, this protocol's design make use of a concept called neural network synchronization. Server and each connected client must create special type of neural network called Tree Parity Machine then compute outputs of their neural networks and exchange them in an iterative manner through the public channel. By learning and exchanging public outputs of their networks, client's and server's neural networks will be synchronized, meaning they will have identical synaptic weights, after some time. Once synchronization is achieved, weights of networks are used for secret key derivation. For the purposes of encryption/decryption of subsequent communication this symmetric key is used.

References & External Links
Official website
http://www.cisjournal.org/journalofcomputing/archive/vol4no1/vol4no1_1.pdf
http://giesl.blogspot.in/2012/09/neural-network-synchronization-protocol.html

Artificial neural networks